Omdurman Ahlia University (OAU) is a community non-profit university in Omdurman, Sudan. 
It was opened on 1 November 1986 as Omdurman Ahlia College, and was upgraded to University status on 7 May 1995.

As of September 2011, the university was a member in good standing of the Association of African Universities.

References

Universities and colleges in Sudan
Educational institutions established in 1986
Omdurman
1986 establishments in Sudan